Jacob Christian Lunøe Gjerding (17 June 1929 – 21 February 1994) was a Danish diver. He competed in the men's 10 metre platform event at the 1952 Summer Olympics.

References

External links
 

1929 births
1994 deaths
Danish male divers
Olympic divers of Denmark
Divers at the 1952 Summer Olympics
People from Vejle Municipality
Sportspeople from the Region of Southern Denmark